Legislative Assembly elections were held in the Indian state of Rajasthan in 2003. The incumbent ruling party INC lost to the BJP.

Exit polls

Results
Source:

Party-wise

Elected members

References

2003
2003
Rajasthan